The Swain County Courthouse is a historic courthouse located at Main and Fry Streets in Bryson City, the county seat of Swain County, North Carolina.  The two-story Classical Revival structure was designed by Frank Pierce Milburn and R. S. Smith, and built in 1908.  It has a central core block, which is fronted by a Classical tetrastyle portico with Ionic columns and has a hip roof.  This block is flanked by symmetrical wings, except for the southern facade, where a secondary entrance is flanked by Ionic pilasters.  It is the county's third courthouse; the first was a log structure built in 1872, and the second was built in 1880 after the first burned down.

The courthouse was listed on the National Register of Historic Places in 1979. The building is now used as the Swain County Heritage Museum.

See also
National Register of Historic Places listings in Swain County, North Carolina

References

County courthouses in North Carolina
Courthouses on the National Register of Historic Places in North Carolina
Neoclassical architecture in North Carolina
Government buildings completed in 1908
Buildings and structures in Swain County, North Carolina
National Register of Historic Places in Swain County, North Carolina
1908 establishments in North Carolina